Loitsche-Heinrichsberg is a municipality in the Börde district in Saxony-Anhalt, Germany. It was formed on 1 January 2010 by the merger of the former municipalities Loitsche and Heinrichsberg.

References

Börde (district)